George Bubb Dangerfield (28 October 1904 in Newbury, Berkshire – 27 December 1986 in Santa Barbara, California) was a British-born American journalist, historian, and the literary editor of Vanity Fair from 1933 to 1935. He is known primarily for his book The Strange Death of Liberal England (1935), a classic account of how the Liberal Party  in Great Britain ruined itself in dealing with the House of Lords, woman suffrage, the Irish question, and labour unions, 1906–1914.  His  book on early 19th century US history The Era of Good Feelings, won the 1953 Pulitzer Prize for History.

Biography
Dangerfield was born in Berkshire, England, and educated at Forest School, Walthamstow (then in Essex).  His first memory, he wrote in his thirties, was "of being held up to a window and shown Halley's Comet" in 1910. In 1927 he received his B.A. from Hertford College, Oxford.  In 1930 he moved to the United States, married Mary Lou Schott in 1941, and became an American citizen in 1943.

Dangerfield's The Strange Death of Liberal England was not given much attention by academic historians when it first appeared in 1935, but has gained admirers over the years because of its lively style and trenchant analysis. It remains one of the best accounts of the failure of the Liberals to deal effectively with increasingly vehement demands from Irish Unionists and Irish Nationalists, industrial workers, and suffragettes.  In 1941 Dangerfield published a work on the early life of Edward VII, Victoria's Heir: The Education of a Prince.

After serving in the United States Army with the 102nd Infantry Division during World War II, he returned to the study of history and wrote The Era of Good Feelings (1952), a history of the period of the same name between the presidencies of James Madison and Andrew Jackson, covering from the start of the War of 1812 to the start of Jackson's administration on 4 March 1829.  Dangerfield's book characterises the period as constituting the transition "from the great dictum that central government is best when it governs least to the great dictum that central government must sometimes intervene strongly on behalf of the weak and the oppressed and the exploited." The book won the 1953 Bancroft Prize and the 1953 Pulitzer Prize for History. He later followed up his work on this period in American history with The Awakening of American Nationalism: 1815–1828 (1965), an instalment in Harper and Row's "The New American Nation" series of histories.

A Guggenheim Fellowship in 1970 remunerated Dangerfield an extended research stay in Europe. In the UK and in Ireland, he collected material for his last book, The Damnable Question: A Study of Anglo-Irish Relations, which was a finalist in 1976 for the National Book Critics Circle Award in General Nonfiction.

Personal life
Dangerfield was the father of two daughters, Mary Jo Lewis and Hilary Fabre, and a son, Anthony. He died of leukaemia in Santa Barbara, California, where he had taught for a few years at the University of California, Santa Barbara.

Quotations
"If the novel can go to history, history can go to the novel, at least to the extent of bringing a creative imagination to bear upon its characters.... History, which reconciles incompatibles, and balances probabilities, by its very nature eventually reaches the reality of fiction. And that is the highest reality of all."
"When codes, when religions, when ideas cease to move forward, it is always in some shining illusion that an alarmed humanity attempts to take refuge." --The Strange Death of Liberal England, 343 (Stanford University Press ed., 1997)

Bibliography
Bengal Mutiny: The Story of the Sepoy Rebellion (1933)
The Strange Death of Liberal England (1935)  online free
Victoria's Heir: The Education of a Prince (1941) 
102d thru Germany: WWII Unit History, 102nd Infantry Division(1945) 70-page booklet prepared and designed with the assistance of "T/4[Sergeant] George B. Dangerfield"
The Era of Good Feelings (New York: Harcourt, Brace & Co., 1952) . 1953 Pulitzer Prize for History.
Chancellor Robert R. Livingston of New York 1746–1813 (1960)
The Awakening of American Nationalism 1815–1828 (1965) 
The Damnable Question: A History of Anglo-Irish Relations (1976)

References

1904 births
1986 deaths
British emigrants to the United States
Alumni of Hertford College, Oxford
People from Newbury, Berkshire
Pulitzer Prize for History winners
Bancroft Prize winners
People educated at Forest School, Walthamstow
Deaths from leukemia
Deaths from cancer in California
American male journalists
20th-century American journalists
English historians
English male journalists
20th-century American historians
20th-century American male writers